Vladimir Pavlovich Orlov (16 August 1921 – 4 April 1999) was a Soviet politician, who was the Chairman of the Presidium of the Supreme Soviet of the Russian SFSR from 1985 until 1988.

References
Head of Biggest Soviet Republic Out in Shuffle

1921 births
1999 deaths
People from Mosalsky District
Soviet Ministers of Finance
Central Committee of the Communist Party of the Soviet Union members
Seventh convocation members of the Soviet of the Union
Eighth convocation members of the Soviet of the Union
Ninth convocation members of the Soviet of the Union
Tenth convocation members of the Soviet of the Union
Eleventh convocation members of the Soviet of the Union
Heroes of Socialist Labour
Recipients of the Order of Lenin
Heads of state of the Russian Soviet Federative Socialist Republic